High Pressure is an album by jazz pianist Red Garland, recorded in 1957 but not released until 1961 on Prestige Records.

Track listing 
"Soft Winds" (Benny Goodman, Fletcher Henderson) – 13:47
"Solitude" (Duke Ellington, Eddie DeLange, Irving Mills) – 8:33
"Undecided" (Sid Robin, Charlie Shavers) – 6:52
"What Is There to Say?" (Vernon Duke, Yip Harburg) – 5:58
"Two Bass Hit" (Dizzy Gillespie, John Lewis) – 8:48
Recorded on November 15 (#3–4) and December 13 (#1–2, 5), 1957.

Personnel 
 Red Garland – piano
 John Coltrane – tenor sax
 Donald Byrd – trumpet
 George Joyner – double bass
 Art Taylor – drums

References 

1961 albums
Albums produced by Bob Weinstock
Prestige Records albums
Red Garland albums
Albums recorded at Van Gelder Studio